The Bulletin of Marine Science is a peer-reviewed scientific journal published by the Rosenstiel School of Marine and Atmospheric Science of the University of Miami. The journal was established in 1951 as the Bulletin of Marine Science of the Gulf and Caribbean and obtained its current name in 1965. All content is available electronically, and for issues older than three years, free of charge.

Scope 
The Bulletin of Marine Science covers marine biology, ecology, biological oceanography, fisheries management,  marine policy,  marine geology,  marine geophysics,  marine chemistry,  atmospheric chemistry,  meteorology, and physical oceanography.

References

External links 
 

Oceanography journals
Quarterly journals
Publications established in 1951
English-language journals
Delayed open access journals